Anthonie Wurth (born 26 May 1967) is a Dutch judoka. He competed in the men's half-middleweight event at the 1992 Summer Olympics.

References

External links
 

1967 births
Living people
Dutch male judoka
Olympic judoka of the Netherlands
Judoka at the 1992 Summer Olympics
People from Smallingerland
Sportspeople from Friesland